The Hofje van Mevrouw van Aerden is a museum and former hofje in Leerdam, Netherlands, on the Kerkstraat (numbers 57 and 89).

It was built during the years 1770-1772 on the former location of the "Kasteel van Leerdam", a castle that was destroyed by the Spanish in 1574. The hofje was founded by Maria Ponderus, the daughter of a surgeon who at 20 married the 50-year-old widower Pieter van Aerden, notary in The Hague. She lived to 92, surviving her husband and three children, who also had no issue. She decided to leave her fortune to a hofje for women of the Protestant faith. Though she had intended her hofje for the poor of The Hague, by the time she died the most of her poor relations were living in Leerdam. Through connections with the House of Orange, the site of the old castle of Leerdam was chosen to build the hofje.

Art collection
A large collection of paintings was also left to the hofje, including paintings by leading 17th-century Dutch painters such as genre pieces by Frans Hals (1x), Cornelis de Man (1x), Dirck van der Lisse (2x), and Theodoor van Thulden (1x); portraits by Adriaen Hanneman (1x), Hendrick Cornelisz van Vliet (2x), Gerard ter Borch (2x), and Mattheus Verheyden (2x); still lifes by Pieter Claesz (1x), Cornelis de Heem (2x), Ottomar Elliger (1x), and Laurens Craen (1x); and landscapes by Hendrick Jacobsz Dubbels (2x), Philips Koninck (1x), and Jacob Salomonsz van Ruysdael (1x). These hang in the regent's rooms. 

On 28 May 2011 the paintings Two laughing boys with mug of beer by Hals and Wooded landscape by Jacob van Ruysdael were stolen. On 2 November 2011 they were recovered.

References

Maria Ponderus on historici.nl

Hofjes
1770 establishments in the Dutch Republic
Rijksmonuments in South Holland
Museums in South Holland
18th-century architecture in the Netherlands